Stenopola is a genus of spur-throat toothpick grasshoppers in the family Acrididae. There are about 13 described species in Stenopola, found in the Americas.

Species
These species belong to the genus Stenopola:

 Stenopola bicoloripes (Descamps & Amédégnato, 1972)
 Stenopola bohlsii Giglio-Tos, 1895
 Stenopola boliviana (Rehn, 1913)
 Stenopola caatingae Roberts & Carbonell, 1979
 Stenopola dorsalis (Thunberg, 1827)
 Stenopola flava Roberts & Carbonell, 1979
 Stenopola nigricans Roberts & Carbonell, 1979
 Stenopola pallida (Bruner, 1906)
 Stenopola puncticeps (Stål, 1861)
 Stenopola rubrifrons Roberts & Carbonell, 1979
 Stenopola tigris Roberts & Carbonell, 1979
 Stenopola viridis Roberts, 1980
 Stenopola vorax (Saussure, 1861)

References

External links

 

Acrididae